Jerf el Ahmar is a Neolithic site in northern Syria, which dated back between 9,200 and 8,700 BC.

History
Jerf el Ahmar contained a sequence of round and rectangular buildings, which is currently flooded by the Lake Assad following the construction of the Tishrin Dam. For five centuries, the site was shaped by the Mureybet culture, which had artifacts such as flint weapons and decorated small stones. The first transitions to agriculture in the region could be observed by the discovery of wild barley and einkorn. The first evidence of lentil domestication appears in the early Neolithic at Jerf el Ahmar.

Notes

References

Archaeological sites in Aleppo Governorate
Tells (archaeology)
Upper Mesopotamia
Pre-Pottery Neolithic